Jonathan Pekar (born March 20, 1970) is an American producer, actor, comedian, director, artist and musician from Memphis, Tennessee.

Early life

At age 4, Pekar threw his first art show at the Memphis College of Art. At age 15, he was the lead singer/songwriter for the punk rock band Distemper and became obsessed with Skateboarding. At age 17, he relocated to Los Angeles and was cast in several commercials and in various television shows and movies such as Beverly Hills 90210, The Skateboard Kid, and Spy.

In the 90's, he became a paid regular at The Comedy Store in Hollywood and formed the punk rock band Are You A Cop. In the years to follow, Pekar graduated from the USC School of Cinematic Arts and started his producing career for various companies including Walt Disney Studios (Burbank), 20th Century Fox, The Discovery Channel, 7th Level Productions, Netter Digital, SST Records and Ardent Studios.

Today, he owns and operates Pekar Films and is in the rock n roll bands Pig Star and Are You A Cop; he is still skateboarding.

Career

Acting
Jonathan started his acting career in 1982 as Moses in Moses and the Freedom Fanatics for Grace-St. Luke's Episcopal Church which gained him the attention of Jackie Nichols, founder of Playhouse on the Square where he was then cast in Peter Pan, Fiddler on the Roof, Torch Song Trilogy, March of the Falsettos and Richard Harris' international tour of Camelot.

In 1987 Pekar relocated to Los Angeles and was signed to Writers and Artists Agency under the guidance of Joan Scott. He appeared in Spy, Beverly Hills 90210, and The Skateboard Kid.

In 1997, as a stand-up comedian, Pekar became a paid regular at The Comedy Store in Hollywood.

In 2006, he graduated from the USC School of Cinematic Arts with honors and went on to work as a Director/Producer for The Discovery Channel before returning to Memphis to head Ardent Studio's Film Department where Pekar won an Emmy. After Ardent Studios Founder John Fry passed, Pekar started Pekar Films where his team of creative cohorts fly around the world making documentaries, television shows, music videos and promotional vehicles with an emphasis on animation and comedy.

Filmography

Film

Television

Awards

Also in 2012, he won two Telly awards.

References

External links
The Commercial Appeal Jonathan Pekar is back from L.A. "Making Videos and Winning Awards"
IMDb IMDB Jonathan Pekar "The Skateboard Kid", "The Spy", "Beverly Hills 90210"
RSVP Memphis Jonathan Pekar Filming Memphis "Filming Memphis"
Mix Magazine Winning an Emmy "Emmy Award"
Memphis Daily News Jonathan Leading Ardent's Film Department "Jonathan at the helm"
TV Guide Beverly Hills 90210 TV Guide Credits
Memphis Flyer Pig Star "Pig Out with Pekar"
Pekar Films website The Official Website

1970 births
Living people
Male actors from Memphis, Tennessee